Trojanella is a genus of harvestman in the family Travuniidae. There is one described species in Trojanella, T. serbica. It has been found only in a single cave on Stara Planina Mountain in Serbia.

References

Further reading

 
 
 

Harvestmen